Bakersfield, California, held a general election for mayor on March 3, 2020. It saw the re-election of incumbent Karen Goh.

Municipal elections in California are officially non-partisan.

Candidates

Declared
 Joseph Caporali, military veteran and filmmaker; candidate for mayor in 2008.
 Karen Goh, incumbent mayor and former Kern County supervisor. (Party preference: Republican)
 Joey Harrington (write-in), business owner.
 Mark Hudson (write-in), business owner.
 Gregory Tatum, military veteran and pastor; candidate for mayor in 2016 and State Senate in 2018. (Party preference: Republican)

Results

References

Bakersfield
Mayoral elections in Bakersfield, California
Bakersfield